Castet-Arrouy is a commune in the Gers department in southwestern France.

Geography
The river Auroue flows north through the commune and forms part of its northeastern border.

Population

Sites of interest
The Church of Saint Blandine is the main church of Castet-Arrouy. The choir was painted with murals by artist Paul Noël Lasseran in 1901.

See also
Communes of the Gers department

References

Communes of Gers